Yaginumanis is a genus of East Asian jumping spiders that was first described by F. R. Wanless in 1984.  it contains three species, found in Japan and China: Y. cheni, Y. sexdentatus, and Y. wanlessi. It is named in honor of Japanese arachnologist Takeo Yaginuma, who described the type species in 1984.

References

Salticidae genera
Salticidae
Spiders of Asia